The Yellowstone Park bison herd  is a bison herd in Yellowstone National Park. It is probably the oldest and largest public bison herd in the United States, estimated in 2020 to be 4,800 bison. The bison in the Yellowstone Park bison herd are American bison of the Plains bison subspecies. Yellowstone National Park may be the only location in the United States where free-ranging bison were never extirpated, since they continued to exist in the wild and were not reintroduced.

Name
Bison are distantly related to the two "true buffalo", the Asian water buffalo and the African buffalo. "Bison" is a Greek word meaning ox-like animal, while "buffalo" originated with the French fur trappers who called these massive beasts , meaning ox or bullock. The name "Bison" is considered to be scientifically correct, as a result of standard usage the name "buffalo" is listed in many dictionaries as an acceptable name for American Buffalo or bison. The term "buffalo", dates to 1635 in North American usage when the term was first recorded for the American mammal. It has a much longer history than the term "bison", which was first recorded in 1774.

Ecology 

Yellowstone National Park has large areas of alpine meadows and grass prairie and this provides a nearly optimum environment for American bison who live in river valleys, and on prairies and plains. Their typical habitat is open or semi-open grasslands, as well as sagebrush grasslands, semi-arid lands, and scrublands. Some lightly wooded areas are also known historically to have supported bison. Bison will also graze in hilly or mountainous areas where the slopes are not steep. Though bison are not particularly known as high altitude animals, members of the Yellowstone Park bison herd are frequently found at elevations above 8,000 feet (2,400 m) and a herd started with founder animals from Yellowstone, the Henry Mountains bison herd, is found on the plains around the Henry Mountains, Utah, as well as in mountain valleys of the Henry Mountains to an altitude of 10,000 feet (3,000 m).

Gray wolves, and grizzly bears are apex predators of bison, but bison meat is not a major component of their diet. Competitive pressure from the other large grazing mammals in Yellowstone Park may also help limit the number of bison in the herd, but this is not considered to have had a significant effect on bison numbers. Disease, including various viruses, parasites and brucellosis, have a greater effect on bison population.

The Yellowstone Park bison herd is divided into two sub-herds that are somewhat isolated from each other. The northern range herd which numbers approximately 2300 individuals ranges from the northern park entrance near Gardiner, Montana through the Blacktail Plateau and into the Lamar Valley. The central interior herd, which numbers approximately 1400 individuals, ranges from the Madison River valley into the Hayden Valley and Upper and Lower Geyser Basins.

The Buffalo Field Campaign and Western Watersheds Project filed a petition in 2014 that contends that these herds are two separate groups and are genetically distinct. They asked that the bison be declared endangered or threatened under the Endangered Species Act with a separate population limit for each of the two herds. They claim hunting, trapping, hazing, capture and slaughter of the bison disproportionately impacted the central interior herd, reducing the size of the herd dramatically during the last two decades. The Fish and Wildlife Service rejected the listing in 2015 and 2019, arguing that the herds are not genetically distinct. A judge ruled that the agency applied the wrong standard and failed to address a significant aspect of the question.

Management

American Bison once numbered in the millions, perhaps between 25 million and 60 million by some estimates, and they were possibly the most numerous large land animal on earth.  However, by the late 1880s, they had been hunted to near extinction throughout North America. The Yellowstone Park bison herd was the last free-ranging bison herd in the United States being the only place where bison were not extirpated.  The Yellowstone Park bison herd is descended from a remnant population of 23 individual bison that survived the mass slaughter of the 19th century in the Pelican Valley of Yellowstone Park. To assist in the species' revival, in 1896 the United States government obtained one bull and seven cows from the Lincoln Park Zoo bison herd for Yellowstone. In 1902, a captive herd of 21 Goodnight plains bison was introduced to the park and then moved to the Lamar Valley and managed as livestock until the 1960s, when a policy of natural regulation was adopted by the park. Circa winter 1924, Yellowstone hosted about 2,000 bison and the whole population was herded together to appear in a stampede scene for The Thundering Herd, a 1925 Paramount Pictures adaptation of a Zane Grey novel. (The 2,000 number was very possibly a publicist's exaggeration; in September 1925, The New York Times reported there were about 800 animals in the Yellowstone herd.)

Over the years, the National Park Service and states bordering the park have implemented various plans to limit exposure of Yellowstone Bison to cattle herds outside the park.  Efforts have including hunting, hazing Bison back into the park, vaccinations and exporting excess Bison to other locations.  The Interagency Bison Management Plan is a cooperative, multi-agency effort that guides the management of bison and brucellosis in and around Yellowstone National Park. The National Park Service, USDA-Forest Service, USDA-Animal & Plant Health Inspection Service, Montana Department of Livestock and Montana Fish Wildlife & Parks adopted the first plan in 2000.   Since 2009, the Confederated Salish and Kootenai Tribes, the Inter Tribal Buffalo Council, and the Nez Perce Tribe have participated in the planning. The plan is aimed at:
 Maintain a wild, free-ranging bison population; 
 Reduce the risk of brucellosis transmission from bison to cattle; 
 Manage bison that leave Yellowstone National Park and enter the State of Montana; 
 Maintain Montana's brucellosis-free status for domestic livestock.

Management is focused on keeping the Yellowstone Bison population at levels that limit migration outside the park. Methods include slaughter and export of excess bison to other suitable habitats. The National Park Service targets approximately 3,000 bison as the optimal herd size for the park. In 2016 the population had grown to approximately 5,500 animals. In the winters of 2016/2017 and 2019/2020 the park service reduced the herd size by at least 900 animals.

The bison at Yellowstone National Park have become the foundation animals for many other bison herds throughout the United States, such as the Henry Mountains bison herd and (partially) the Wind Cave bison herd, and several groups in the United States and Canada are making efforts to return bison to nature parks or reserves in parts of their previous natural range. Some large tracts of open range and natural habitat have been purchased by private individuals or groups to prepare for bison reintroduction.

Brucellosis
Brucellosis is a highly contagious zoonosis caused by ingestion of unpasteurized milk or undercooked meat from infected animals, or close contact with their secretions. Brucellosis occurs in the Yellowstone Bison Herd and the normal winter migrations of bison outside the park have raised concerns that brucellosis infected Bison may infect cattle. The United States government has programs to eradicate brucellosis in domestic livestock. Since 1934, an estimated $3.5 billion in federal, state, and private funds has been spent on brucellosis eradication in domestic livestock.

Hunting

Hunting occurs when many of the bison leave the park during the winter, north into Montana, especially through the Lamar Valley. The State of Montana has authorized buffalo hunts because of concerns about spreading brucellosis to local domestic cattle.

Genetics

The Yellowstone Park bison herd is considered to have minimal cattle gene introgression, meaning that there is no evidence of significant hybridization between these bison and cattle.

Officially, the "American Buffalo" is classified by the United States Government as a type of cattle, and the government allows private herds to be managed as such.  This is a reflection of the characteristics that bison share with cattle.  Though the American bison (Bison bison) is not only a separate species, but actually in a separate genus from domestic cattle (Bos primigenius), it clearly has a lot of genetic compatibility with the latter, and American bison can interbreed freely with cattle.  Moreover, when they do interbreed, the crossbreeds tend to look very much like purebred bison, so appearance is completely unreliable as a means of determining what is a purebred bison and what is crossbred with cattle.  Many ranchers have deliberately crossbred their cattle with bison, and it would also be expected that there could be some natural hybridization in areas where cattle and bison occur in the same range.  Since cattle and bison eat similar food and tolerate similar conditions, they have often been in the same range together in the past, and opportunity for cross breeding may sometimes have been common.

In recent decades, tests were developed to determine the source of mitochondrial DNA in cattle and bison, and it was found that most private 'buffalo' herds were actually crossbred with cattle, and even most state and federal buffalo herds had some cattle DNA.  With the advent of nuclear microsatellite DNA testing, the number of herds that identified to contain cattle genes has increased.  DNA from domestic cattle (Bos taurus) has been detected in nearly all bison herds examined to date. Significant public bison herds that have minimal cattle gene introgression are the Yellowstone Park bison herd, the Henry Mountains bison herd (which was started with bison taken from Yellowstone Park), the Wind Cave bison herd, the Elk Island Nation Park bison herd, and the Wood Buffalo National Park bison herd and subsidiary herds descended from it, in Canada.

A landmark study of bison genetics that was performed by James Derr of the Texas A&M University corroborated this. The Derr study was undertaken in an attempt to determine what genetic problems bison might face as they repopulate former areas, and it noted that bison were faring well, despite their apparent genetic bottleneck. One possible explanation for this might be the small amount of domestic cattle genes that are now in most bison populations, though this is not the only possible explanation for bison success.

In the study, cattle genes were also found in small amounts throughout most herds. "The hybridization experiments conducted by some of the owners of the five foundation herds of the late 1800s, have left a legacy of a small amount of cattle genetics in many of our existing bison herds." He also said, "All of the state owned bison herds tested (except for possibly one) contain animals with domestic cattle mtDNA." It appears that the one state herd that had no cattle genes was the Henry Mountains bison herd in the Henry Mountains of Utah, which were descended from transplanted animals from Yellowstone Park. It is unknown if the Book Cliffs extension of this herd in Central Utah is also free of hybridization; the extension involved mixing the founders with additional bison from another source.

A separate study by Wilson and Strobeck, published in Genome, was done to define the relationships between different herds of bison in the United States and Canada, and to determine whether the bison at Wood Buffalo National Park in Canada and the Yellowstone Park bison herd were possibly separate subspecies, and not Plains bison. Some people had suggested that the Yellowstone Park bison were actually either of the B. b. athabascae (wood buffalo) subspecies, or else that they were of an unspecified 'mountain' subspecies. In the study, it was determined that the Wood Buffalo park bison were actually cross breeds between plains bison and wood bison, but that their predominant genetic makeup was in fact that of the expected "wood buffalo" (B. b. athabascae).

See also

 American Bison Society
 Animals of Yellowstone
 European bison
 Elk Island National Park bison
 List of Yellowstone National Park-related articles

References 

Bison herds
Yellowstone National Park
Wood Buffalo National Park